Edward McHugh (born 1969) is an American artist from Philadelphia whose work includes photography and sculpture.

Education and work
McHugh trained as a painter, printmaker, and sculptor, graduating from the Hussian School of Art in Philadelphia in 1991. He later studied at Crown Point Press in San Francisco.

McHugh applies a thin layer of archival wax to the surface of photographic prints, using a painterly brushstroke, giving it a handmade surface. The Seattle Times described an image of the battleship USS New Jersey treated with this technique, saying that "the effect is both enchanting and unsettling".

Exhibitions

Sans Titre, Boulder Museum of Contemporary Art, Boulder, Colorado, 1999
Altered Photo, Center on Contemporary Art, Seattle, 2010
American Photography X2, Towson University, Towson, Maryland, 2013/14

References

1969 births
Living people
American artists